Basketball at the 2004 Summer Olympics was the sixteenth appearance of the sport of basketball as an official Olympic medal event. It took place at the Helliniko Olympic Indoor Arena, a part of the Hellinikon Olympic Complex, in Athens, for the preliminary rounds, with the later stages being held in the Olympic Indoor Hall at the Athens Olympic Sports Complex. 

Argentina, led by NBA standouts like Manu Ginobli and Luis Scola, won the country's first (and, as of 2023, only) gold in the event.

In Olympic basketball tournaments, 12 teams take part. The host nation (Greece in 2004) automatically receives a berth in the tournament. By winning the two World Championship tournaments in 2002, FR Yugoslavia, now named Serbia and Montenegro, also put a team into the men's tournament and the United States a team in the women's tournament.

The remaining 10 spots in each tournament were allocated by the five Olympic zones. Each of these zones held its own tournaments to select its entries in the Olympic tournament. Africa was allocated one spot in each of these, Oceania was allocated two apiece, and Europe was allocated three. Furthermore, the Americas were allocated three teams for the men's tournament and just one in the women's tournament, whereas Asia was allocated just one in the men's tournament and three in the women's tournament.

The United States' team's third-place finish was an embarrassment for the country that birthed the sport. The following Summer Olympics, the so-called Redeem Team sported an improved roster led by international superstars like Lebron James, Kobe Bryant and Dwyane Wade, under the coaching of Mike Krzyzewski, returned the gold medal to the U.S.

Medalists

Qualification 
A National Olympic Committee (NOC) may enter just one men's team with 12 players, and just one women's team with 12 players in the regional tournaments. The reigning world champions and the host country qualify automatically, as do the winners of the five continental championships, plus the runner-up and third place teams from the Americas and Europe competitions, and the runner-up Oceania in the men's tournament. For the women's tournament, the extra teams consisted of the runner-up and third place teams from Asia and Europe, and the runner-up from Oceania.

Basketball – Men

Basketball – Women

Format 
 Twelve teams are split into two preliminary round groups of six teams each.
 The top four teams from both groups qualify for the knockout stage.
 Fifth-placed teams from both groups compete for 9th place in an additional match.
 Sixth-placed teams from both groups compete for 11th place in an additional match.
 In the quarterfinals, the matchups are as follows: A1 vs. B4, A2 vs. B3, A3 vs. B2 and A4 vs. B1.
 From the eliminated teams at the quarterfinals, the loser from A1 vs. B4 competes against the loser from B1 vs. A4 for 7th place in an additional match. The remaining two loser teams compete for 5th place in an additional match.
 The winning teams from the quarterfinals meet in the semifinals as follows: A1/B4 vs. A3/B2 and A2/B3 vs. A4/B1.
 The winning teams from the semifinals contest the gold medal. The losing teams contest the bronze.

Tie-breaking criteria:

 Head to head results
 Goal average (not the goal difference) between the tied teams
 Goal average of the tied teams for all teams in its group

Teams

Men 
The men's event involved twelve teams split equally into two groups.

Group A: 

Group B:

Women 
The women's event involved 12 teams split in two groups.

Group A: 

Group B:

Men's tournament

Preliminary round 
The four best teams from each group advanced to the quarterfinal round.

Group A

Group B

Knockout stage

Classification round

Women's tournament

Preliminary round 
The four best teams from each group advanced to the quarterfinal round.

Group A

Group B

Knockout stage

Classification round

Final standings

References

External links 
 Olympics: men's basketball tournament 2004
 Olympics: women's basketball yournament 2004
 FIBA Olympic basketball website
 2004 Olympic Games: Tournament for Men, FIBA Archive. Retrieved June 20, 2011.
 2004 Olympic Games: Tournament for Women, FIBA Archive. Retrieved June 20, 2011.
 Official result book – Basketball

 
Olympic
2004 Summer Olympics events
2004
2004